Kainuu, also historically known as Cajania, is one of the 19 regions of Finland (maakunta / landskap). Kainuu borders the regions of North Ostrobothnia, North Savo and North Karelia. In the east, it also borders Russia (Republic of Karelia).

Culturally Kainuu is part of larger Eastern-Finnish cultural heritage. The dialect of Kainuu resembles Savonian and Karelian dialects.

Geography
Boreal forest makes up most of the biome in Kainuu. The forest in Kainuu mostly consists of birches, pines and spruces. The atypical regional geography and landscape consist of lakes, hills and vast uninhabited forest areas.

The largest lake in the region is the Oulujärvi (928.09 km²), one of the largest lakes in Finland. Its shorelines, open waters and islands in Kainuu belong to the municipalities of Vaala, Paltamo and Kajaani.

The highest point in Kainuu is the Iso Tuomivaara (385 m), located in the municipality of Hyrynsalmi. The regional climate is continental. The three most populous urban areas in Kainuu (December 31, 2017) are Kajaani town center (30,028), Vuokatti village (6,207) in Sotkamo municipality, and Kuhmo town center (5,349).

Historical province

Municipalities 

The region of Kainuu is made up of eight municipalities, of which two have city status (marked in bold).

Kajaani sub-region:
 Kajaani (37,664)
 Paltamo (3,493)
 Ristijärvi (1,356)
 Sotkamo (10,524)

Kehys-Kainuu sub-region:
 Hyrynsalmi (2,432)
 Kuhmo (8,820)
 Puolanka (2,784)
 Suomussalmi (8,342)

Former municipalities
 Vuolijoki
 Kajaani rural municipality

Changes in the region's municipalities

 Vaala (moved to Northern Ostrobothnia in 2016)

The administrative capital of Kainuu is Kajaani.

Vaala, formerly one of the nine municipal members of the Kainuu region became part of the Northern Ostrobothnia in the beginning of the year 2016.

The municipality of Vaala is still counted as part of the region in the end of 2015.

Economy

In 2012 Kainuu region had a total of 29 722 jobs. The largest sector in the employment market of Kainuu is the service sector with (21 915) 73,7 % share of the regions entire employed workforce. The industrial and construction sector follow as the 2nd largest actor with (5 243) 17,6 % of the employed working under these fields. Third largest sector is the forest industry and agriculture with a (2 228) 7,5 % workforce. The smallest uncounted factor in these statistics are the miscellaneous jobs that don't fit easily under any of three general terms mentioned above. The miscellaneous jobs form 336 1,2 % of the region's workforce.

The total unemployment of Kainuu was in 2014 6 001 which is 16,9 % of the workforce of the area. The nationwide average at the time was 12,4 %. The worst unemployment was in the town of Kuhmo with (771) 19,6 % people unemployed. The town with the least amount of unemployment was the municipality of Sotkamo with (684) 14,1 % people unemployed. Kainuu has a total of 4301 firms by each sector in its economy. Three of the largest sectors are Agriculture, forestry and fishing, wholesale and retail trade and construction. The smallest three are education, mining & quarrying and information & communication.

State, municipal and private sectors are the three big players in the regions employment market. Private sector is the largest actor in the region with 51% of the workforce working on it. Municipal sector comes up to 29% and the state has 7% of the workforce. Statewide averages are 58% for the private, 23% for the municipal and 6% for the state sectors. The number of companies in the region of Kainuu is 3 429.

Education

The regional education qualification level is at 67,4 % between the age groups of 15 years and over. The average of women in the region for the educational qualification is 67,4 % and for men 67,3 %. The nationwide average is 69,4% for the whole age group and the nationwide average for women is 70,1 % and for men 68,7%. Based on these numbers Kainuu has the 8th lowest educational level out of the 19 regions of Finland.

Kainuu has several further education institutes and organizations that are centralized in the town of Kajaani. These are Kajaani University of Applied Sciences, AIKOPA and Kainuu Vocational College (KAO). Many of the municipalities and towns also offer education for the upper secondary education.

Kajaani University of Applied Sciences (KAMK) offers education, research, development and innovation services. These happen in the fields of activity tourism, nursing and health care, business and innovation, information systems and mechanical engineering. The students number at 2000 in the KAMK and the staff at 235.

AIKOPA is part of KAMK's and University of Oulu's service that is provided for joint adult and continuing education. AIKOPa offers services like education, expertise, research and development at the higher education level.

The Kainuu Vocational College (KAO) has a goal to give training, vocational and basic skills for both the young people and adults who number approximately at 2600. KAO has six different field of education through which students and the adults alike can receive qualification and training. These are technology and transportation, tourism, catering and domestic services, natural resources, healthcare, culture and business and administration.

Transportation

Kainuu has a total of 4 732 kilometers of road network and the average of 505 private cars / 1000 inhabitants.

The air traffic of Kainuu had 81 854 cumulative passengers of which 77 981 were domestic and 3 873 were international passengers. The only major airport in the region is the Kajaani airport which is located some 7 kilometers (4 mi) northwest from the Kajaani town center.

The Kajaani railway station works as the central hub for the Kainuu regions train passenger and freight transportation. The passenger traffic from and to Kajaani railway station runs between the line 13 of Helsinki-Kajaani and the line 14A of Oulu-Kontiomäki.

Tourism and culture

Tourism is a significant factor in the regional economics of Kainuu. The two most important seasons for the regions tourism are winter and summer. Winter season is the more popular one amongst the tourists and travelers. The single most popular month for the overnight stays in Kainuu is July. The count for the nights spent in the Kainuu region was 970 953 in the year of 2014. Domestic tourism forms major part of the annual tourism. Around 9-10% of the annual tourism of the regions comes from the international tourism. The variation of this number is dependent on the recent economic downturn that has caused drop in the Russian tourism towards the Kainuu region in which the Russians are the single largest customerbase.

Kainuu region has three major sports and ski resorts, which are Paljakka, Ukkohalla and Vuokatti. These resorts offer various sport possibilities for different seasons such as skiing, downhill skiing and hiking among others.
 
Outside the sport resorts are also tourism related service clusters and networks such as Wild Taiga which offer various services from different actors of Kuhmo and Suomussalmi municipalities. Other significant regional points of interests from the perspective of tourism are the areas around Oulujärvi, Kajaani and Ristijärvi.
 
In tourism Oulujärvi is concentrated on offering services in water- and culture based tourism around the lake. Kajaani, the town on the shores of lake, is the so-called capital of Kainuu and through this it is also the central transportational hub in the area. The town is central for the tourists who come to the Kainuu region either by train or by plane to the Kajaani Airport.

Kajaani offers many commercial and culturally related services for tourists. The historical village of Paltaniemi in Kajaani is well-known as the birthplace of the Finnish poet Eino Leino, and Elias Lönnrot lived in the same village when he compiled the Finnish national epic Kalevala. The writer Ilmari Kianto also influenced the Kainuu region, and through his works, Kianto made known the description of the Kainuu poor people at the time. Other examples of these cultural services includes the Town Theater, Kaukametsä Culture and Congress Center, Kainuu Museum and the Kajaani Art Museum and many others. Kajawood, a film production company, also known as the "Finnish Hollywood", is located in Sotkamo, Kainuu.

Cultural events and sightseeing
The region of Kainuu and its municipalities offer wide variety of different seasonal events and sightseeing possibilities. Cultural events vary from sports to entertainment and cultural events.

Kuhmo Chamber Music Festival 
Kajaani Poetry Week 
Kajaani Dance
Kajaani International Dog Show 
Swamp Soccer
Swamp Rock

Suomussalmi Rock
Lanka Fest
Kainuu Orienteering Week
Lost in Kajaani
Kainuun Musiikki juhlat
Ethno Music Festival Sommelo

History- and art-related sightseeing
Eino Leino House
Kainuu museum
Kajaani Art Museum
The Raatteen Portti Winter War Museum
Winter War Museum
Kajaani Castle
Kajaani Church
The Kalevala Village

Regional food culture
Food products that come from the nature are essential part of the local food culture in Kainuu. These include fish, various berries, game meat and variety of mushrooms. A few examples of these are the traditional vendace soup, smoked meat soup and the sweetened lingonberry porridge.

Bread and bakery are also one of the corner stones of Kainuu-based kitchen. These include rye bread and local specialties such as a traditional sweet delicacy called Rönttönen and the bread cheese / squeaky cheese that is often served together with cloudberry jam or as is.

Local media
The Kainuu region's most popular newspaper is the morning newspaper Kainuun Sanomat with 50 000 daily readers and 16 093 copies in circulation. There are also several other smaller news- and free newspapers which are more local and town based in their news coverage and distribution. The more popular example in the Kainuu region is the Koti-Kajaani with a total of 30 276 - 38 369 copies in circulations in the weekdays of Wednesday and Saturday.

Local newspapers
Kainuun Sanomat
Koti-Kajaani
Kuhmolainen
Puolanka-lehti
Sotkamo-lehti
Ylä-Kainuu
Väylä

Local radio stations
Kainuu has two regional radio stations among the statewide radio stations. Radio Kajaus bases it content on pop music, news and interviews on the current affairs. Kainuun Radio is one of the 19 regional radiostations owned by the state company Yleisradio (YLE). Between 6.30 – 17.00 the station broadcasts its own regional content. Outside of that the station will share the contents of the statewide Yle Radio Suomi station.

Radio Kajaus
YLE Kainuun radio

Regional politics

In the Finnish parliamentary election Kainuu is part of the Oulu electoral district which elects 18 members of the Finnish parliament from the local district.

Parliamentary elections 2019

A municipal election is held every 4 years and the members of the elected municipal councils also elect members amongst themselves to represent their respective municipality in the regional council of Kainuu. Traditionally, up to this date, the Centre Party has been the largest political entity in both the Oulu electoral district and in the region of Kainuu.

Municipal elections 2012

Regional government and regional development

Regional Council of Kainuu
The Regional Council of Kainuu is one of the 19 regional councils in Finland. The law gives these councils two mains tasks that are development of the region and the land use and planning in the region. A regional council is a key actor in the area that is responsible of the implementation of the Structural Fund programs of the EU. Networking with other actors both within and outside the region is important in protecting and promoting the unique culture of the region.

Regional Council of Kainuu is governed by the regional assembly, decisions carried out by the regional board and assisted by the Regional council's office, which is led by the regional mayor. The Regional Assembly of Kainuu has 35 members. The regional council's office has about 20-25 employees and is divided into different teams depending on the area of their responsibility and expertise.

The establishing treaty of the Regional Council of Kainuu (accepted in December 2015) defines the Assembly tasks as follows:

The Regional Assembly elects a council chairman and also the 1st and 2nd vice chairmen to whom the assembly also grants a right to be present and to speak at the meetings of the Board of the Regional Council.
The Regional Assembly approves an estimated budget for the Regional Council for each financial year and a financial plan for the Regional Council at least for 3 years.
Regional Assembly decides based on the preparations of the audit board, auditor’s report and reminders in the report on how these give rise to action. While approving the financial statement the Regional Assembly also decides on the discharge for the entities and persons accountable.
The Regional Assembly chooses the members of the Regional Board and also chooses the chairman and the vice chairmen and decides upon the length of the term of the Regional Board.
Regional Assembly also has the ability to establish such institutions and actors which it sees fit for the moment.
Regional Assembly appoints an audit board for the inspection of the management and the financial situation. The Assembly also decides upon the proposal of the audit board whether there is a call for one or two auditing firm.

Regional Assembly's tasks, Regional Council of Kainuu

Areas of responsibility
Land Use and Planning

Land use planning, cooperation with interest groups and other authority related tasks which are the key fields of responsibility in the regional land use planning.

The Regional land use plan is drafted by the Regional Council of Kainuu and approved by the Regional Assembly. Up until the beginning of the year 2016 the approved plan was sent to be validated at the Ministry of Environment. The changes in the legislations deemed that the need for the validation of the Ministry of Environment was no longer necessary.

From the perspective of the municipalities involved in the regional development, regional land use plan is the guide and framework that has to be taken into account when the municipalities plan or change their local master plans or local detailed plans. Regional land use plans should also be noted by the authorities of whose decision making the plans affect. The regional land use plan is a map which contains the planning entries, instructions and descriptions. These affect the contents of the land use plan, give background to the decisions made and bring forth the meaningful data about the effectiveness factors. Phased regional land use land works as supplement and provide information to the previously mentioned regional land use plan.

Regional Development
 
Regional development unit is responsible for the regional development plan. This task is given by the law to the regional councils. Regional development also has the task of leading, planning and implementing both the national and EU level regional- and cohesion policymaking in the region of Kainuu. This is done in cooperation with neighboring regions. Regional development views that developing and maintaining the regions vigor is important. This relates to the work that is done on both the local, national and international level in cooperation with other actors. 
Cooperation and Supervision of Interests

According to 5§ of the establishing treaty of the regional council of Kainuu the mission for the council is to observe and take into account in their own work the aspects of interest driving between other actors and cooperation. In this the establishing treaty emphasizes the importance of managing the partnerships both inside the region and outside of it. The later refers to national, EU and other international level of activities. The themes for interest driving are changed depending how the situation and times dictate it and these themes and their changes can be found from the project catalog document that is kept by the regional council.

Cooperation and communication have an important role from the perspective of the interest driving. The establishing treaty notes that these two should have the role of upholding the positive image of the region of Kainuu both inside and outside of the region. An interest driving team is formed for the purpose of this role that also has members from other important actors from other organizations in addition to the regional council of Kainuu.

Projects

According to the charter of the Regional council, one of the essential tasks of the organization is improving the wellbeing of the region's population. Among other interest driving goals, improving the living- and the business environment in the region is one of the goals of the regional development. 
Projects, plans and other development related-work are ways to work towards these goals with the relevant actors inside and outside of the region. The project programs and their goals are controlled to some extent by the goals set in the regional strategic programme.

For the project work the regional council has to do tasks that relate to requisitioning, co-financing and being as a partner in the projects. The project preparations are divided in the responsibilities inside the regional council teams (land use & planning, regional development etc.) depending on their field of expertise that are for example in charge of the international funding of the project. In the years of the 2014 – 2020 EU funding is offered towards the region of Kainuu in the programs of Baltic Sea Region Programme, Northern Periphery and Arctic Programme, Interreg Europe, ENI Kolarctic and the Karelia CBC.

Other activities of the Regional Council

Europe Direct Kainuu

The European Commission maintains an information network called the Europe Direct and one of its offices can be found from the office of regional council of Kainuu. The Europe Direct offers general information about the Europe, EU, functions and actions of the union and the funding possibilities that it offers together with the themes that the funds are emphasizing. For the information distribution the office uses social media, news letters and brochures.

Key strategies and documents driving the Regional Councils actions

The Regional Plan of Kainuu 2035

The Kainuu Regional Plan of 2035 represents the political intentions of the region. This document has the strategies that hold inside of them the vision for the region and the politically desired outcomes for the future. The regional plan is approved by the Regional Assembly of Kainuu.

The Regional land use plan

From the perspective of the regional planning and land use the regional land use plan is the most important document that drives their actions. The timeframe for this plan varies between 10 – 30 years and the examination for the current regional land use plan started in the year of 2014...

Regional Programme 2014 - 2017

Regional programmes intent is to bring up ways and means through which the long timespan strategic goals of the Regional Plan 2035 can be accomplished. Strategic choices and emphasizing certain themes are ways through which the regional council aims to achieve these goals. This includes cooperation in the teams of regional development and the interest driving team and also utilizing other development actions taken by the organization.

Four emphasized themes are set for the programme of 2014 – 2017. These have themes that aim towards the development of different sectors in the society. The timeframe for each regional programme is four years.

Implementation plan

An implementation plan is compiled out for the region of Kainuu. The time frame for this plan is two years. The function for the implementation plan is to monitor, prioritize and harmonize the region councils work together with other authorities that relate to the goals set in the regional programme. The implementation plan is an instrument to guiding projects in a way that the themes and goals of the regional programmes and the condition for the fund funding are met and achieved in these projects.

Regional policymaking

Regional Assembly 2013–2016

The Regional Assembly of 2013-2016
Pentti Kettunen, Chairman
Eero Suutari, 1st Vice Chairman
Kati Nykänen, 2nd Vice Chairman

Municipalities and towns each get certain count of representatives in the assembly. This is based on their population size. These are divided into three different categories. These numbers also include the vice representavies from each member of the assembly.

Kajaani: 15 representatives in total.
Kuhmo, Sotkamo and Suomussalmi: 4 representatives each.
Hyrynsalmi, Puolanka, Paltamo and Ristijärvi 2 representavies each.

The Regional Board of 2015-2016
Timo Korhonen, Chairman
Eija Hakkarainen, 1st Vice Chairman
Marisanna Jarva 2nd Vice Chairman

Regional Youth Council of Kainuu

Kainuu region also has its own Regional Youth Council, which is also the only regional level youth council in Finland. The council was formed in 2008 and it is meant to be a nonpartisan influencing group for the regions youth. Two members are selected from each municipality and town and also from the local higher education institutions – KAO & AMK.

The members of the youth council are appointed by their local municipal councils or their institutions student council. The term if two years long and during that time the youth council will also get a total of seven sponsor representatives from the Regional Assembly and the Kainuus Social and Welfare Council. The Regional Councils office will help the Youth Council with such things as setting up meetings, compile agenda for the next meeting and giving counsel and guidance on how to make meeting records, how decision making works and so forth.

Youth councils work isn't defined by law, but the Regional Assembly has decided that the Youth Council should have four main tasks among more minor ones. The main tasks are:

Youth Council will hold at least one annual Regional Youth Forum.
Youth Council should meet both the local policymakers and parliament members.
Youth Council will take part in the meetings of the Regional Assembly of Kainuu.
Youth Council takes part in to the development and planning of the region’s future.

Extra duties are as follows:
Youth council must keep an close eye on the regional developments and try to influence the decision making that affects the local youth.
Youth Council should inspire the local youth to take part in what the societal and political activities have to offer at large.
Youth Council should also participate in seminars, events and training and if the need arises – they should also help to organize these events.

Term for each regional youth council is two-year long. The youth council representatives will select one chairman amongst themselves who is accompanied by two vice chairmen for the two-year term. The council also selects a secretary who will cooperate together with a contact from the regional council of Kainuu who gives the necessary help, guidance and advice that the youth council secretary needs to handle their tasks.

See also 
Kainuu people
Kainuu Brigade
Kainuu Road
Nälkämaan laulu
Vuolijoki

References

External links 

 Kainuu (official site).
http://www.kainuunliitto.fi/en/

 
Regions of Finland